The 2023 Memorial Cup (branded as the 2023 Memorial Cup presented by Kia for sponsorship reasons) is a four-team round-robin format ice hockey tournament that will be held at Sandman Centre in Kamloops, British Columbia from May 26–June 4, 2023. It is the 103rd Memorial Cup championship which determines the champion of the Canadian Hockey League (CHL). The tournament will be hosted by the Kamloops Blazers, who won the right to host the tournament over the Kelowna Rockets.

Road to the Cup

OHL playoffs

QMJHL playoffs

WHL playoffs

Tournament games
All times local (UTC −7)

Round-robin

Round-robin standings

Tiebreaker

Semifinal game

Championship game

Awards
The CHL handed out the following awards at the conclusion of the 2023 Memorial Cup:

 Stafford Smythe Memorial Trophy (Most outstanding player): 
 Ed Chynoweth Trophy (Top scorer):
 George Parsons Trophy (Most sportsmanlike player): 
 Hap Emms Memorial Trophy (Best goaltender): 
 Memorial Cup All-Star Team:
Goaltender:
Defence:
Forwards:

References

External links
 Memorial Cup
 Canadian Hockey League

Memorial Cup
Memorial Cup
Memorial Cup tournaments
Ice hockey competitions in British Columbia
Sport in Kamloops